Peter John Winkelman is the current chairman of English association football club Milton Keynes Dons, as well as managing director of the property development consortium Inter MK Ltd that was responsible for developing the Denbigh North district of Milton Keynes.

Early career
His earlier career was in pop music production, as a CBS executive.

Involvement in football

Winkelman grew up as a supporter of his home town club, Wolverhampton Wanderers before his eventual involvement with Wimbledon and ultimately Milton Keynes Dons.

He is most notable for his involvement in the controversial decision in 2001 by the directors of Wimbledon FC to relocate to Milton Keynes, around 60 miles from their traditional south London base. The club subsequently went into administration in 2003, and played their first match in Milton Keynes in September, controlled by the administrator. At the end of the season, the club was bought out by a consortium led by Winkelman, who became the club's chairman. The new board relaunched the club as Milton Keynes Dons FC, also giving the side a new all-white strip and club crest.

Personal life
He is married to wife Berni. Winkelman moved to Milton Keynes in 1993, and established Great Linford Manor, a seventeenth-century mansion converted into a recording studio complex in Great Linford, a district in Milton Keynes.

Honours
In June 2013, Winkelman was awarded an honorary doctorate by the Milton Keynes-based Open University "to mark his contribution to education through the world of professional football". On 12 November 2015, Milton Keynes Council awarded him the council's highest ceremonial honour, the Freedom of the Borough of Milton Keynes.

References

Milton Keynes Dons F.C.
English football chairmen and investors
Living people
1957 births